Supersonic Guitars in 3-D is the seventh studio album by American instrumental rock band Los Straitjackets, released on September 9, 2003, by Yep Roc Records.

Track listing

Personnel
Los Straitjackets
Danny Amis – guitar
Eddie Angel – guitar, bass
Pete Curry – bass, guitar
Jimmy Lester – drums
Guest musicians
Anja Dixon – vocals
Stax – vocals
Billy Zoom – flute, saxophone
Mitch Manker & his Brass Section – trumpets
D. J. Bonebrake – vibraphone
Additional personnel
Mark Neill – production
Peter DuCharme – engineering
Jim DeMain – mastering
Doctor Alderete – artwork
Mary Gunn – graphic design

References

Los Straitjackets albums
2003 albums